Anthropophagy is the custom and practice of eating human flesh. It may refer to:
Human cannibalism, when one human consumes the flesh of another
Anthropophage, a member of a mythical race of cannibals
Child cannibalism, the act of eating a child or fetus
Self-cannibalism, the act of eating one's own flesh
Man-eating, the consumption of human flesh by a non-human predator
Anthropophagy (art), an art movement

See also
Cannibalism (disambiguation)
Hematophagy, the consumption of blood by certain animals
List of feeding behaviours